Peter Green (born 3 May 1974) is a former Australian rules footballer who played with Carlton in the Australian Football League (AFL).

Notes

External links

Peter Green's profile at Blueseum

1974 births
Carlton Football Club players
Living people
Australian rules footballers from New South Wales